Kristy Lavin is a player for England women's national basketball team.

References

Year of birth missing (living people)
Living people
Place of birth missing (living people)
British women's basketball players
English women's basketball players
Commonwealth Games medallists in basketball
Commonwealth Games bronze medallists for England
Basketball players at the 2006 Commonwealth Games
Medallists at the 2006 Commonwealth Games